Osceola Fundamental High School is a fundamental high school in Seminole, Florida operated by Pinellas County Schools. The school is named after the Seminole war chief, Osceola.

School Mission

Osceola Fundamental High School’s mission is to sustain an environment where staff, students, parents and community work collaboratively to support all students in meeting or exceeding graduation requirements.

Fundamental

Osceola is the only fundamental High School in Pinellas County and in Florida. Osceola became a fundamental high school in 2006, but it did not take full effect until 2010 after the last non-fundamental students graduated. A fundamental school requires all Parents to attend monthly PTSA and SAC meetings, and sign all homework completed by Students. If the parent does not attend the meeting, they are put in front of an IAC Board, where they decide whether the student should leave the system. If the parent does not sign 10 homeworks in one class (or the student does not do 5 homeworks), the same happens. The school has a zero-tolerance policy to bullying. Any act of physical bullying results in permanent expulsion from the school and the fundamental system.

Extra curricular activities
Extra curricular activities include Student Government Association, Guitar, Interact Club, National Honor Society, Prep Club, Anime Club, Spanish Club, The Oracle, FFEA Florida Future Educators of America, Tri-M Music Honor Society, Warriors Against Crime, PMAC Principal's Multicultural Advisory Committee, International Thespian Society, Drama Club, Students Rights and Responsibilities, GSA, Dance Club WVTV, Keyboard, Debate Team, Academic Team, Ukulele Club, Juggling Club, and R.E.D., Religious Exploration through Discussion.

Athletics
Athletics include baseball, basketball, cheerleading, cross-country, flag football (girls), football, golf, marching band, soccer, softball, spring football, swimming, tennis, track, volleyball (girls), and wrestling.

Girls Basketball: Coached by former Major League pitcher Seth McClung.

Former Principals

Bob Kalach (1981–1983)
John McLay (1983–1989)
Richard Misenti (1989–1994)
Doug Smith (1994–2004)
Carol Moore (2004–2010)
Michael Bohnet (2010–present)

Notable alumni

References

High schools in Pinellas County, Florida
Public high schools in Florida